The Fondation Louis-de-Broglie is a French foundation for research into physics. The foundation is located at the French Academy of Sciences in Paris.

Overview
The Fondation Louis-de-Broglie was created at the Conservatoire national des arts et métiers in 1973 by Louis de Broglie on the occasion of the fiftieth anniversary of the discovery of matter waves. Louis de Broglie bequeathed the foundation property acquired thanks to his Nobel prize in physics.

The foundation receives a grant from the Fondation de France.

Annales de la Fondation Louis de Broglie

Since 1975 the foundation has published the peer-reviewed, open access, scientific journal Annales de la Fondation Louis de Broglie. Much of the published work centers on the De Broglie–Bohm theory or pilot wave theory of quantum mechanics.

The annals is or has been indexed and abstracted in the following bibliographic databases:

INSPEC
Naver
Norwegian Register for Scientific Journals, Series and Publishers
Publons
Scimago
Scopus
WorldCat (OCLC)
Zentralblatt MATH, only up to 2014.

Presidents
 1973-1991: Louis Néel (Nobel Laureate in Physics)
 1991-2000: René Thom (Fields Medal recipient)
 2001–2021: Georges Lochak

References

External links
 Official Website
 Annales de la Fondation Louis de Broglie (journal archive date – 18 February 2008)

Non-profit organizations based in France
Foundations based in France
1973 establishments in France
French Academy of Sciences
Educational institutions established in 1973
Scientific organizations established in 1973